Honoré III (Honoré Camille Léonor Grimaldi; 10 November 1720 – 21 March 1795) ruled as Prince of Monaco and was Duke of Valentinois from 1731 to 1793. Honoré was the son of Louise Hippolyte, Princess of Monaco, and her husband, Prince Jacques I.

Life

Honoré was born on 10 November 1720.

On 20 May 1732, he moved to Hôtel Matignon in Paris with his father and remained there, even after the proclamation in 1733 of him as Prince of Monaco. Antoine Grimaldi, le Chevalier de Grimaldi, acted as regent for the prince between 1732 and 1784, when Honoré chose to reside in Paris. This situation remained the same for half a century until Antoine's death in 1784, when Honoré III was already 64 years old. Although he was open to the revolutionary ideas of the time, he was imprisoned on 20 September 1793. At his liberation a year later, he was ruined, and his property under seal.

Family
While in Paris, it was suggested that he marry Marie Louise de La Tour d'Auvergne, but the marriage never materialised. In 1751, he married Maria Caterina Brignole (d. 1813). 

The couple had two children; Honoré IV, Prince of Monaco and Joseph Grimaldi (10 September 1763 – 28 June 1816) before legally separating in 1770, and Marie-Catherine married her long-time companion Prince de Condé in 1798, after her husband's death.

Ancestry

External links
 Official Website of the Princely Family of Monaco

|-

|-

|-

1720 births
1795 deaths
18th-century Princes of Monaco
18th-century peers of France
Honore
Honore
Honore
Honore
Dukes of Valentinois
Honore
Modern child monarchs
Prisoners and detainees of France